India, officially the Republic of India, is a country in South Asia. It is made up of 28 states and 8 union territories. All Indian states have their own government and union territories come under the jurisdiction of the central government. As with most of the other countries India, has a national emblem—the Lion Capital of Sarnath.

Apart from India's national emblem, each of its states and union territories have their own seals and symbols which include animals, birds, trees, flowers, etc. A list of state birds of India is given below. See Symbols of Indian states and territories for a complete list of all state characters and seals.

States

Union territories

See also
 Indian peafowl, the national bird of India
 List of Indian state symbols
 List of Indian state flags
 List of Indian state emblems
 List of Indian state mottos
 List of Indian state songs
 List of Indian state foundation days
 List of Indian state animals
 List of Indian state flowers
 List of Indian state trees

References

External links
 List of symbols
 Maharashtra Pakshimitra
 Blue Jay: The State Bird of Orissa.pdf

State Birds
Indian state birds
State birds
Birds